Lawrence High School is a four-year public high school located in Cedarhurst, New York, and is a part of Lawrence Public Schools, and is the district's only public high school.

As of the 2018–19 school year, the school had an enrollment of 871 students and 85.8 classroom teachers (on an FTE basis), for a student–teacher ratio of 10.2:1. There were 456 students (52.4% of enrollment) eligible for free lunch and 37 (4.2% of students) eligible for reduced-cost lunch.

Details 

Work study programs are available, as is an Outward Bound program affiliated with Hofstra University.  Students can earn college credit by taking college-level courses in conjunction with C.W. Post College and Syracuse University. The New York State Education Commissioner has recognized the library as an "Electronic Doorway Library," one of the first libraries in the state officially designed for its pioneering use of computers and telecommunications technology.

The school mascot is the Golden Tornado. The school colors are blue and gold (royal blue and gold). The yearbook is the Lawrencian and the student newspaper is called Mental Pabulum. The school motto is "" (lit. I never retrace my steps, i.e., "No Stepping Back").

Sports 

The team won the Long Island Football Championships in 1995 and 2006. In 2011 it lost a record-setting 78–61 non-overtime championship game to Sayville High School. It was also runner-up in the game in 1997, 2007 and 2009.

Lawrence High School won the Long Island Class II football championship, defeating heavily favored Bellport High School 28–27 at Stony Brook University on November 25, 2006.

Lawrence High School won the 2012 Long Island Class III football championship by defeating Sayville 21–20. Then in November 2013, Lawrence defeated Huntington 49–35 in the Class III LIC for their 2nd back-to-back title. In November 2014, Lawrence beat Sayville 40–35 and won the 2014 LIC Class III.

Lawrence High School's bowling team won the Conference 5 Title in the 2006 season. Lawrence High School's varsity gymnastics team also won a conference title in 2003.

The 2011 comedy Win Win, starring Paul Giamatti, was filmed in the Lawrence High School wrestling room.

Notable alumni

 Lyle Alzado (1949–1992), NFL defensive tackle for Oakland Raiders and Denver Broncos.
 Marc Stuart Dreier (born 1950), lawyer who was sentenced to 20 years in federal prison in 2009 for committing investment fraud using a Ponzi scheme
 Harrison Greenbaum (born 1986), comedian, magician and Andy Kaufman Award winner
 Mickey Hart (born 1943), Grateful Dead percussionist
 Jon Heyman (born 1961), baseball writer
 Helen Hicks (1911–1974), pro golfer, one of 13 co-founders of LPGA in 1950
 Wendy Kaufman (born 1958), best known for her commercial appearance as Wendy, the Snapple Lady"
 Michael Kimmel (born 1951), author, professor, sociologist, gender activist
 Arthur L. Kopit (born 1937), playwright
 Frederic Lebow (born 1956), screenwriter, While You Were Sleeping Gilbert Levine (born 1948), conductor
 Peggy Lipton (born 1946), actress
 Steve Madden (born 1958), shoe designer
 Ira Magaziner (born 1947, class of 1965), aide to President Bill Clinton
 Shane Olivea (19812022), starting NFL offensive tackle for San Diego Chargers
 Evan Roberts (born 1983), sports radio personality who co-hosted Joe & Evan with Joe Benigno and Carton & Roberts with Craig Carton.
 Phyllis Rose (born 1942, class of 1960) professor, Wesleyan University; author, Parallel Lives, The Year of Reading Proust''
 Connie Russell (1923–1990), singer and actress
 Aaron Russo (1943–2007) (1956–1960) entertainment manager and producer; Emmy Award winner; politician
 Tyler "Lil Tecca" Sharpe (born 2002), rapper, singer and songwriter
 Michael Stern (born 1979)

Notable faculty
 Frank Scoblete, English teacher from the 1970s through 1990s

References

External links 
Lawrence High School
Lawrence Public Schools
Data for the Lawrence Public Schools, National Center for Education Statistics
Lawrence High School Varsity Football vs Garden City
Lawrence High School Varsity Football vs Bellport Long Island Championship 2006
Lawrence High School Varsity Football Rutgers Cup
Lawrence High School Wrestling Team vs Garden City on 1-12-07

Alumni links
Class of 1959 Alumni Site
Class of 1961 Alumni Site

Public high schools in New York (state)
Schools in Nassau County, New York